The men's triple jump at the 2022 World Athletics Championships was held at the Hayward Field in Eugene on 21 and 23 July 2022.

Summary

With 17.05m the automatic qualifier, only two jumpers made it on their first attempt, Olympic Gold Medalist Pedro Pichardo and Olympic Silver Medalist Zhu Yaming.  Returning bronze medalist Hugues Fabrice Zango and Lázaro Martínez made on their second attempt, Emmanuel Ihemeje, only 2 cm on his first attempt, finally got one on his third. It took 16.68m to get into the final, eliminating defending champion Christian Taylor who is still on the road to recovery from a 2021 achilles rupture.

Only two other people in the competition had ever jumped that far, none of the others had been within a foot (30cm). Three jumpers later, Zango popped 17.55m. The next jumper, Donald Scott moved into bronze position with a 17.14m which lasted only two jumps when Andrea Dallavalle hit a 17.25m. At the beginning of the second round, Pichardo confirmed his position with a 17.92m, then Zhu moved into the bronze medal position with a 17.31m. The results were set. Save a 6th round 17.17m from Ihemeje, nobody in the top 6 improved their position. Returning two time silver medalist Will Claye struggled with his marks and Martínez couldn't land a fair jump. Neither were able to qualify for three more attempts.

Records
Before the competition records were as follows:

Qualification standard
The standard to qualify automatically for entry was 17.14 m.

Schedule
The event schedule, in local time (UTC−7), was as follows:

Results

Qualification 
Athletes attaining a mark of at least 17.05 metres ( Q ) or at least the 12 best performers ( q ) qualify for the final.

Final 
Results:

References

Triple jump
Triple jump at the World Athletics Championships